Track 61 is a storage track abutting a private railroad platform on the Metro-North Railroad in Manhattan, New York City. It is located beneath the Waldorf Astoria New York hotel, within an underground storage yard northeast of Grand Central Terminal. The platform is part of the Grand Central Terminal complex.

History
Track 61 is part of the "Lex Yard", a twelve-track storage yard under the Waldorf Astoria Hotel. It shares a platform with track 63, to its west. A similar platform exists between tracks 53 and 54, to the east. The yard was built during the construction of Grand Central Terminal in the 1910s, and served the terminal's power station and heating plant. The platforms at tracks 61/63 and 53/54 were originally used to carry ashes away. The power plant was demolished in 1930 to make way for the hotel.

The platform was not originally intended to be used as a station, but its location made it ideal for unobtrusive access to the Waldorf Astoria when the hotel was built. Track 61 was famously used by General John J. Pershing in 1938; by Franklin Delano Roosevelt during World War II in 1944; and by General Douglas MacArthur in 1951. The track was also used for the exhibition of American Locomotive Company's new diesel locomotive in 1946;  a fashion show by Filene's and the New Haven Railroad in 1948; a charity-benefit dinner in 1955; and an event featuring Andy Warhol in 1965. The 1946 event was the only event in which Track 61 was open to the public.

In 1978, there were plans to convert Track 61 into a platform for Amtrak trains, though this never happened. The track was also reportedly set as an escape option for President George W. Bush, Colin Powell, and Condoleezza Rice in 2003, while in U.N. General Assembly meetings. , it has been reported to still be in occasional use.

Roosevelt traincar
Track 63 held MNCW #002, a baggage car, for about 20 to 30 years. The railcar's location near Roosevelt's Track 61 made the former tour guide Dan Brucker and others falsely claim that it was the president's personal train car that transported his limousine. The baggage car was moved to the Danbury Railway Museum in 2019.

See also

Beach Pneumatic Transit
Cobble Hill Tunnel
Transportation in New York City
Transportation in New York State

References

External links
Grand Central Terminal Guide: What to See
Track 61 on "Urban Ghosts"
A Look Inside Track 61, The Secret Train Platform Under The Waldorf-Astoria

Metro-North Railroad
Subterranea (geography)
Waldorf Astoria New York
Grand Central Terminal
Upper class culture in New York City